Sticker grass is a common name which may refer to bur-producing plants including:

Various species of genus Cenchrus
Various species of genus Soliva
Tribulus terrestris